Patryk Procek (born 1 March 1995 in Rybnik, Poland) is a Polish footballer as a goalkeeper.

References

External links

1995 births
Living people
People from Rybnik
Polish footballers
Association football goalkeepers
Skra Częstochowa players
KS ROW 1964 Rybnik players
Ethnikos Achna FC players
GKS Katowice players
AEL Limassol players
PAEEK players
III liga players
II liga players
Cypriot First Division players
Polish expatriate footballers
Polish expatriate sportspeople in Cyprus
Expatriate footballers in Cyprus